Earl of Arundel is a title of nobility in England, and one of the oldest extant in the English peerage. It is currently held by the Duke of Norfolk, and is used (along with the Earl of Surrey) by his heir apparent as a courtesy title. The earldom was created in 1138 or 1139 for the French baron William d'Aubigny. Its origin was the earlier grant by Henry I to his second wife, Adeliza of Louvain, of the forfeited honour of Arundel, which included the castle and a large portion of Sussex. After his death, she married William, who thus became master of the lands, and who from about the year 1141 is variously styled earl of Sussex, of Chichester, or of Arundel. His first known appearance as an earl is at Christmas 1141. Until the mid-13th century, the earls were also frequently known as Earl of Sussex, until this title fell into disuse. At about the same time, the earldom fell to the originally Breton FitzAlan family, a younger branch of which went on to become the Stuart family, which later ruled Scotland and England.

A tradition arose that the holder of Arundel Castle should automatically be Earl of Arundel, and this was formally confirmed by King Henry VI. An Act of Parliament in 1627 confirmed this designation, and retrospectively applied the earldom to the lords of Arundel, some authorities holding that the earldom stretched back to the reign of Richard I (specifically 1189). However, this designation was not always followed. Some of the lords of Arundel were never addressed as earls during their lifetimes, but nevertheless are counted and numbered as earls here. Other sources may not include some of the earls listed below, and may consider the earldom to have been created more than once.

In his 1834 book on the earls of Arundel, M. A. Tierney (chaplain to the duke of Norfolk) maintains that the first incarnation of the earldom was with the House of Montgomery. Roger of Montgomery, 1st Earl of Shrewsbury was one of William the Conqueror's top generals, and William bestowed on him, amongst several hundred other manors, the property at Arundel, with the charge to fortify it with a castle. Montgomery is believed to have built the motte that survives to this day, and is thought to have built a wooden keep on it, overlooking the river Arun. Montgomery and two of his sons are counted by many as being the first incarnation of the earldom, but are often not counted amongst the earls.

In 1580 the 12th Earl, and last FitzAlan to hold the title, died without a male heir. His daughter Mary FitzAlan had married the attainted 4th Duke of Norfolk, and the title passed to their son, Philip Howard, before he too was attainted for treason in 1589. The earldom of Arundel was restored to his son  Thomas following the accession of King James I. The 5th Earl of Arundel, the 5th Howard to hold the title, was restored to the principal Howard title of Duke of Norfolk in 1660, and the title has descended with that dukedom ever since.

In 1842, by royal warrant, Henry Fitzalan-Howard, 14th Duke of Norfolk and 13th Earl of Arundel, and his siblings, assumed the surname FitzAlan-Howard, used by the family line to today.

First creation (c. 1138)
 William d'Aubigny, 1st Earl of Arundel (d. 1176)
 William d'Aubigny, 2nd Earl of Arundel (d. 1193)
 William d'Aubigny, 3rd Earl of Arundel (c. 1174–1221)
 William d'Aubigny, 4th Earl of Arundel (d. 1224)
 Hugh d'Aubigny, 5th Earl of Arundel (d. 1243)
 John Fitzalan (1223–1267), (6th) Earl of Arundel
 John Fitzalan (1246–1272), (7th) Earl of Arundel
 Richard Fitzalan, Earl of Arundel – 1st, 6th or 8th earl – (1267–1302), great-grand-nephew of the 5th Earl. He received a writ in 1289, at his majority, summoning him to Parliament; this is thought to perhaps be a creation of another earldom of Arundel. See below.

Second creation (1289) 
 Richard Fitzalan, 1st (or 6th) Earl of Arundel (1267–1302)
 Edmund Fitzalan, 2nd (or 7th) Earl of Arundel (1285–1326) (forfeit 1326)
 Richard Fitzalan, 3rd (or 8th) Earl of Arundel (c. 1313–1376) (restored 1331)
 Richard Fitzalan, 4th (or 9th) Earl of Arundel (1346–1397) (forfeit 1397)
 Thomas Fitzalan, 5th (or 10th) Earl of Arundel (1381–1415) (restored 1400)
 John Fitzalan, 6th (or 11th) Earl of Arundel (1385–1421)
 John Fitzalan, 7th (or 12th) Earl of Arundel (1408–1435)
 Humphrey Fitzalan, 8th (or 13th) Earl of Arundel (1429–1438)
 William Fitzalan, 9th (or 14th) Earl of Arundel (1417–1487)
 Thomas Fitzalan, 10th (or 15th) Earl of Arundel (1450–1524)
 William Fitzalan, 11th (or 16th) Earl of Arundel (1476–1544)
 Henry Fitzalan, 12th (or 17th) Earl of Arundel (1512–1580)

Third creation (1580) 
 Philip Howard, 1st, 13th (or 18th) Earl of Arundel (1557–1595) (forfeit 1589)
 Thomas Howard, 2nd, 14th (or 19th) Earl of Arundel (1585–1646) (restored 1604)
 Henry Howard, 3rd, 15th (or 20th) Earl of Arundel (1608–1652)
 Thomas Howard, 4th, 16th (or 21st) Earl of Arundel (1627–1677) (restored as 5th Duke of Norfolk in 1660)

Thereafter the earldom of Arundel has been held by the dukes of Norfolk. The 18th Duke of Norfolk (18th earl) is the current holder.

 Thomas Howard, 5th Duke of Norfolk (1627–1677)
 Henry Howard, 6th Duke of Norfolk (1628–1684)
 Henry Howard, 7th Duke of Norfolk (1655–1701)
 Thomas Howard, 8th Duke of Norfolk (1683–1732)
 Edward Howard, 9th Duke of Norfolk (1685–1777)
 Charles Howard, 10th Duke of Norfolk (1720–1786)
 Charles Howard, 11th Duke of Norfolk (1746–1815)
 Bernard Howard, 12th Duke of Norfolk (1765–1842)
 Henry Howard, 13th Duke of Norfolk (1791–1856)
 Henry Fitzalan-Howard, 14th Duke of Norfolk (1815–1860)
 Henry Fitzalan-Howard, 15th Duke of Norfolk (1847–1917)
 Bernard Fitzalan-Howard, 16th Duke of Norfolk (1908–1975)
 Miles Fitzalan-Howard, 17th Duke of Norfolk (1915–2002)
 Edward Fitzalan-Howard, 18th Duke of Norfolk (b. 1956)

The heir apparent is Henry Fitzalan-Howard, Earl of Arundel and Surrey (b. 1987).
Next in line of succession are Arundel's brothers, Lords Thomas and Philip Fitzalan-Howard.

Footnotes

References 
 
 
 

Earldoms in the Peerage of England
Noble titles created in 1138
Noble titles created in 1289
 

Recusants